Statistics of JSL Cup in the 1981 season.

Overview
It was contested by 20 teams, and Toshiba and Mitsubishi Motors won the championship.

Results

1st round
Honda 3-0 Tanabe Pharmaceuticals
Toshiba 2-1 Sumitomo Metals
Yomiuri 1-2 Nippon Kokan
Mitsubishi Motors 4-0 Teijin Matsuyama

2nd round
Kofu 3-2 Nagoya
Honda 0-3 Furukawa Electric
Yamaha Motors 2-4 Toshiba
Nissan Motors 3-0 Nippon Steel
Hitachi 5-1 Toyota Motors
Nippon Kokan 1-2 Fujita Industries
Yanmar Diesel 3-5 Mitsubishi Motors
Mazda 0-2 Fujitsu

Quarterfinals
Kofu 1-6 Furukawa Electric
Toshiba 3-1 Nissan Motors
Hitachi 3-5 Fujita Industries
Mitsubishi Motors 1-1 (PK 5–3) Fujitsu

Semifinals
Furukawa Electric 2-2 (PK 2–3) Toshiba
Fujita Industries 2-4 Mitsubishi Motors

Final
Toshiba 4-4 Mitsubishi Motors
Toshiba and Mitsubishi Motors won the championship

References
 

JSL Cup
League Cup